Anotopterus sp. (2008) is a species of daggertooth discovered in the New Zealand Antarctic Ocean, at 71°S, and is one of the southernmost daggertooth specimens caught.  Its golden luster and sapphire blue eyes are exquisite, but the colors fade quickly when the fish is removed from its habitat.  The specimen found measured 50 cm and was only half grown.  The fish paralyzes its prey by sinking its teeth into the flesh and then pulling backwards.

References
Stewart, Andrew. "Science report: Denizens of the deep: daggertooth and stareater." NZ IPY-CAML Voyage 2008. Ministry of Fisheries. Crown Copyright: 2008.

Anotopteridae
Undescribed vertebrate species
Fish described in 2008